Roman Müller-Böhm (born 12 December 1992) is a German politician. Born in Essen, North Rhine-Westphalia, he represents the Free Democratic Party (FDP). Roman Müller-Böhm has served as a member of the Bundestag from the state of North Rhine-Westphalia since 2017.

Life 
Müller-Böhm completed his high school diploma in 2012 at the Luisenschule in Mülheim an der Ruhr. Since then he has been studying law in Bochum. He became member of the bundestag after the 2017 German federal election. He is a member on the committee for law and consumer protection as well as the tourism committee.

References

External links 

  
 Bundestag biography 
 

 

 

1992 births
Living people
Politicians from Essen
Members of the Bundestag for North Rhine-Westphalia
Members of the Bundestag 2017–2021
Members of the Bundestag for the Free Democratic Party (Germany)